Emerson Park is a suburban neighbourhood near Hornchurch in the London Borough of Havering, east London.

It is part of the Hornchurch post town and forms part of the Hornchurch and Upminster Parliamentary constituency.

History

Toponymy
Emerson Park is named after Emerson, the eldest son of William Carter of Parkstone, Dorset who bought land in the area for property development in 1895.

Housing
Emerson Park originates from the development of suburban housing in the late 19th century after the coming of the railway. The residential estates that make up the area are Ardleigh Green, Emerson Park and Nelmes. It is located north of the town of Hornchurch and is considered a prestigious neighbourhood in Greater London.

There is some variety in the types of property, however the vast majority are substantially large detached homes on plots of land of at least . The roads in the area are wide and lined with mature trees. The architecture is not entirely Victorian or Edwardian, as some plots have been reused over time and some new homes were constructed in contemporary styles. In January 2019 the average price of all properties sold in the RM11 postcode which includes Emerson Park was approximately £570,000 and the average price of all detached houses sold was approximately £970,000.

Being not far from West Ham United's training ground at Chadwell Heath, the area has historically been popular with footballers. Rob Lee, Diafra Sakho, Frank McAvenie and Ray Parlour are current or former residents.

Education

Transport

Emerson Park is thus a popular commuter neighbourhood, with its station providing connections to the main lines into both London Liverpool Street and London Fenchurch Street.

It is also served by several London Buses routes.

References

External links
 The Campion School: A Catholic Science College
 Emerson Park School: A Specialist Sports College

Areas of London
Districts of the London Borough of Havering